Targa Tasmania is a tarmac-based rally event held on the island state of Tasmania, Australia, annually since 29 April 1992.  The event takes its name from the Targa Florio, a former motoring event held on the island of Sicily. The competition concept is drawn directly from the best features of the Mille Miglia, the Coupe des Alpes and the Tour de Corse.

Rally format 
The rally started as a five-day event, but has been run as a six-day event for anniversaries in 2001, 2006 and 2016.

The layout of the 2016 event was:

 Leg 1 Launceston - George Town - Launceston
 Leg 2 Launceston - St Helens - Launceston
 Leg 3 Launceston - Sheffield - Launceston
 Leg 4 Launceston - Stanley - Strahan
 Leg 5 Strahan - New Norfolk - Hobart
 Leg 6 Hobart - Hobart

In 2008 the course was substantially revised, a number of well liked stages from previous years are now used (Riana), and a number of all new stages were introduced (Mt Claude and Rossarden). Leg 3 was dropped by shortening the Leg 2 East Coast day ending back in Launceston (rather than Hobart). Leg 3 is another loop north out of Launceston (running through Devonport on this day). Leg 4 now runs from Launceston through the lunch stop at Burnie to the evening end at Strahan. It remains the longest tarmac rally in Australia with no repeated stages. Although a couple of stages will share the same piece of road in opposite directions on consecutive days.

The Targa is one of several Tarmac Rally events to be held in Australia. It also has had international connections with Targa New Zealand and Targa Newfoundland which have evolved since the inception of Targa Tasmania.

List of past winners
In 2016 the premier category changed from Modern to Showroom GT2.

Showroom GT4 Competition

Showroom GT2 Competition

Modern Competition

Classic Competition

Trophies Awarded
A Targa Trophy is awarded to the driver and co-driver/navigator of each crew that completes all stages within the specified time for their class of vehicle. In subsequent years, the trophy may be upgraded as follows:

 Golden Targa Trophy - 3 consecutive regular trophies
 Platinum Targa Trophy - having achieved Gold then gaining another 3 consecutive regular trophies

 Diamond Targa Trophy - having achieved Platinum then gaining another 3 consecutive regular trophies
 Gold Diamond Targa Trophy - having achieved Diamond then gaining another 3 consecutive regular trophies

 Platinum Diamond Targa Trophy - having achieved Gold Diamond then gaining another 3 consecutive regular trophies

Once achieving Platinum Gold, the competitor is inducted into the Targa Hall of Fame Legends

In 2019, Geoff Taylor (aged 73+) was the only competitor to have competed in all events. 

In addition, each year the Denny Hulme Memorial Trophy is awarded to the competitor who exhibits tenacity to overcome adversity while completing the event. It was first awarded in 1993.

Notable competitors
Notable past and current competitors have included Andrew Miedecke, Barry Sheene, Bob Wollek, Denny Hulme, Dick Johnson, Glenn Ridge, Greg Crick, Gregg Hansford, Sir Jack Brabham, Jim Richards, Jochen Mass, Steven Richards, Michael Doohan, Murray Walker, Neal Bates, Peter Brock, Peter Fitzgerald, Roger Clark, Rusty French, Sandro Munari, Sir Stirling Moss, Alister McRae, Walter Röhrl and Eric Bana. The first person with a spinal cord injury to compete in the rally was Australian wheelchair rugby player Nazim Erdem.

See also
Australian Targa Championship
Love the Beast

References

 http://www.targatasmania.com.au/Results/Past 
 http://www.targatasmania.com.au/

External links
 Targa Tasmania website
 Eric Bana guns it to Max | Herald Sun
 Team RedBackRacing website
 CAR703 – Rallying for Oncology Research

Motorsport competitions in Australia
Rally competitions in Australia
Motorsport in Tasmania
Recurring sporting events established in 1992